Funkspiel was a German term describing a technique of transmission of controlled information over a captured agent's radio so that the agent's parent service had no knowledge that the agent had turned and decided to work for the enemy. It was a standard technique in radio counterintelligence and was used throughout the world.

Definition
The German term Funkspiel, Playbacks, the British term or the American term, G-V Game, was the transmission of controlled information over a captured agent's radio so that the agent's parent service had no knowledge that the agent had been turned and decided to work for the enemy.

France
Captured radio operators in France were forced to send false messages to British intelligence.

That allowed Nazi intelligence to intercept Allied military information, convey disinformation to the enemy and actively fight resistance movements. By doing so, Nazi intelligence made the pretense of being the French resistance with a script written for the enemy by the Gestapo or the Abwehr. Operations were conducted at 84 Avenue Foch, the headquarters of the Sicherheitsdienst in Paris.

The last false message exchanged with London in the operation was "Thank you for your collaboration and for the weapons that you sent us". However, Nazi intelligence was not aware that British intelligence had known about the stratagem for at least two weeks prior to the transmission. From May 1944 onwards the operation was not a success.

A similar Funkspiel technique, called Operation Scherhorn, was executed by the Soviet NKVD against Nazi secret services from August 1944 to May 1945.

Funkspiel also referred to a technique used by U-boat radio operators in which the frequency of transmission was changed consecutively to confuse Allied intelligence with the objective of picking up enemy transmissions on the original channel.

References 

Counterintelligence
Battles and operations of World War II involving Germany
World War II deception operations
Gestapo
Abwehr operations
Disinformation operations